Boo Boo or Booboo may refer to:

People
 Boo Boo Davis (born 1943), singer
 Booboo Stewart (born 1994), American singer, model, dancer and actor
 Alana "Honey Boo Boo" Thompson, star of the reality television show Here Comes Honey Boo Boo

Arts, entertainment, and media
 Boo Boo (album), the fifth studio album by Toro y Moi
 Boo-Boo (EP), the debut EP from Boston band Big Dipper
 Boo-Boo Bear, a fictional cartoon character on The Huckleberry Hound Show and The Yogi Bear Show
 "Boo Boo Bear," Lori Loud's nickname for Bobby Santiago in The Loud House and The Casagrandes

Other uses
 Boo Boo, an American slang term for a mistake, injury, bruise, or laceration
 Boo boo, a Black slang term for feces
 Boo Boo, the Caribbean English term for a bogeyman
 Boo Boo (dog), the world's smallest dog

See also

 
 
 
Big Boo (disambiguation)
Boo (disambiguation)
Bubu (disambiguation)